The term Curetes may refer to:

Curetes or Korybantes, the dancing attendants respectively of Rhea or Cybele in Greek mythology
Curetes (tribe), in Greek mythology
Curetes or Curibantes, a Latin name for the inhabitants of the island of Krk, in the Adriatic Sea